Old Frisian was a West Germanic language spoken between the 8th and 16th centuries along the North Sea coast, roughly between the mouths of the Rhine and Weser rivers. The Frisian settlers on the coast of South Jutland (today's Northern Friesland) also spoke Old Frisian, but there are no known medieval texts from this area. The language of the earlier inhabitants of the region between the Zuiderzee and Ems River (the Frisians mentioned by Tacitus) is attested in only a few personal names and place-names. Old Frisian evolved into Middle Frisian, spoken from the 16th to the 19th century.

In the early Middle Ages, Frisia stretched from the area around Bruges, in what is now Belgium, to the Weser River in northern Germany . At the time, the Frisian language was spoken along the entire southern North Sea coast. This region is referred to as Greater Frisia or Magna Frisia, and many of the areas within it still treasure their Frisian heritage. However, by 1300, their territory had been pushed back to the Zuiderzee (now the IJsselmeer), and the Frisian language survives along the coast only as a substrate.

A close relationship exists between Old Frisian and Old English; this is due to a shared history, language and culture of the people from Northern Germany and Denmark who came to settle in England from around 400 A.D. onwards.

Phonology

Early sound developments

Generally, Old Frisian phonologically resembles Old English. In particular, it shares the palatalisation of velar consonants also found in Old English. For example, whereas the closely related Old Saxon and Old Dutch retain the velar in dag, Old Frisian has dei and Old English has dæġ . When followed by front vowels the Germanic  changed to a  sound. The Old Frisian for church was tzirke or tzerke, in Old English it was ċiriċe , while Old Saxon and Old Dutch have the unpalatalised kirika. Another feature shared between the two is Anglo-Frisian brightening, which fronted a to  under some circumstances. In unstressed syllables, o merges into a, and i into e as in Old English.

The old Germanic diphthongs *ai and *au become ē/ā and ā, respectively, in Old Frisian, as in ēn/ān ("one") from Proto-Germanic *ainaz, and brād from *braudą ("bread"). In comparison, these diphthongs become ā and ēa (ān and brēad) in Old English, and ē and ō (ēn and brōd) in Old Saxon. The diphthong *eu generally becomes ia, and Germanic *iu is retained. These diphthongs initially began with a syllabic (stressed) i, but the stress later shifts to the second component, giving to iā and iū. For example, thiād ("people") and liūde from Proto-Germanic *þeudō and *liudīz.

Between vowels, h generally disappears (sian from *sehwaną), as in Old English and Old Dutch. Word-initial h- on the other hand is retained. Old Frisian retains th in all positions for longer than Old Dutch and Old Saxon do, showing the gradual spread of the shift from th to d from south to north, beginning in southern Germany in the 9th century as part of the High German consonant shift, but not reaching Frisian until the 13th or 14th century.

Grammar
Old Frisian (c. 1150–c. 1550) retained grammatical cases. Some of the texts that are preserved from this period are from the 12th or 13th century, but most are from the 14th and 15th centuries. Generally, all these texts are restricted to legal writings. Although the earliest written examples of Frisian—stray words in a Latin context—are from approximately the 9th century, there are a few examples of runic inscriptions from the region which are older and in a very early form of the Frisian language. These runic writings however usually consist of no more than inscriptions of a single or few words.

Text sample 

The Creation of Adam.

God scop thene eresta meneska - thet was Adam - fon achta wendem:
thet benete fon tha stene, 
thet flask fon there erthe, 
thet blod fon tha wetere, 
tha herta fon tha winde, 
thene thogta fon tha wolkem, 
thet swet fon tha dawe, 
tha lokkar fon tha gerse, 
tha agene fon there sunna, 
and tha ble'r'em on thene helga om. 
And tha scop'er Eva fon sine ribbe, Adames liava.

English translation: 

God created the first man, that was Adam, from eight things:
the bones from the rock,
the flesh from the earth,
the blood from the water,
the heart from the wind,
the thoughts from the clouds,
the sweat from the dew, 
the (hair)locks from the grass,
the eyes from the sun,
and then He breathed holy breath on it,
and then He created Eve from his rib, Adam's beloved.

Corpus
There are some early Frisian names preserved in Latin texts, and some runic (Futhorc) inscriptions, but the oldest surviving texts in Old Frisian date from the 13th century, in particular official and legal documents. They show a considerable degree of linguistic uniformity.

 Westeremden yew-stick (c. 750–900)
 Fon Alra Fresena Fridome (at TITUS: TITUS)
 Ten Commandements (TITUS)
 17 petitiones (TITUS)
 Londriucht (TITUS)
 Thet Freske Riim (TITUS, ed. E. Epkema, Google Books)
 Skeltana Riucht law code (TITUS)

Notes

References
 Rolf H. Bremmer Jr., An Introduction to Old Frisian. History, Grammar, Reader, Glossary. Amsterdam and Philadelphia: John Benjamins, 2009. 
 Hartmann, Frederik, Old Frisian breaking and labial mutation revisited. Amsterdamer Beiträge zur älteren Germanistik, 2021.

Frisian languages
Languages of the Netherlands
Languages of Germany
Frisian, Old
Languages attested from the 8th century
North Sea Germanic